Berthelinia ganapati is a species of a sea snail with a shell comprising two separate hinged pieces or valves. It is a marine gastropod mollusc in the family Juliidae.

Distribution
The type locality for this species is Southeastern India.

References

Juliidae
Gastropods described in 1975